Don Paul may refer to:

Don Paul (linebacker) (1925–2014), former linebacker for the Los Angeles Rams
Don Paul (defensive back) (1926–2001), former cornerback for the Chicago Cardinals and the Cleveland Browns
Don Michael Paul (born 1963), actor, director, writer and producer
Don Paul (animator), animator and co-director of The Road to El Dorado
Don Paul Fowler (1953–1999), English classicist
Don Paul (born 1936), musician with The Viscounts and later manager of other artists (e.g. Don Partridge)
Don Paul, meteorologist,  see WIVB-TV